Saajher Pradip is a 1955 Bengali film directed by Sudhangshu Mukherjee. This film was written by Prabhabati Devi Saraswati. The music has been composed by Manabendra Mukherjee This is a drama film. This film was released on 18 January 1955. The film stars Suchitra Sen, Chhabi Biswas, Tulsi Chakraborty, Bhanu Bannerjee, Chhaya Devi, Molina Devi, Shishir Batabyal, Gurudas Bannerjee, Kanu Bannerjee, Dhiraj Bhattacharya, Sumana Bhattacharya and Uttam Kumar in the lead roles. The film was produced by Sreelekha Pictures.

Cast
 Suchitra Sen
 Chhabi Biswas
 Tulsi Chakraborty
 Bhanu Bannerjee
 Chhaya Devi
 Molina Devi
 Shishir Batabyal
 Gurudas Bannerjee
 Kanu Bannerjee
 Dhiraj Bhattacharya
 Sumana Bhattacharya
 Uttam Kumar
 Sabita Chatterjee
 Haren Mukherjee
 Sushil Roy

References

External links
 

1955 drama films
1955 films
Bengali-language Indian films
1950s Bengali-language films
Indian drama films
Indian black-and-white films